Jura-Sternwarte Grenchen (Jura Observatory Grenchen) is an astronomical observatory owned and operated by Stiftung Jura-Sternwarte. Built in 1976, it is located near Grenchen in the Canton of Solothurn, Switzerland.

External links
http://www.jurasternwarte.ch

Astronomical observatories in Switzerland
Buildings and structures in the canton of Solothurn
Grenchen